The 2002 Canisius Golden Griffins football team represented Canisius College as a member of the Metro Atlantic Athletic Conference (MAAC) during the 2002 NCAA Division I-AA football season. Led by third-year head coach Ed Argast, the Golden Griffins compiled an overall record of 2–9 with a mark of 2–6 in conference play, tying for seventh place in the MAAC. The team's offense scored 113 points while the defense allowed 329 points. The Canisius football program was discontinued at the conclusion of the 2002 season.

Schedule

References

Canisius
Canisius Golden Griffins football seasons
Canisius Golden Griffins football